The 2017 SangSom Six-red World Championship was a six-red snooker invitational tournament held between 4 and 9 September 2017 at the Bangkok Convention Center in Bangkok, Thailand. The tournament was reduced from 48 players to 32.

Ding Junhui was the defending champion, but he lost 1–6 to Marco Fu in the last 16.

Mark Williams won the title, beating Thepchaiya Un-Nooh 8–2 in the final.

Prize money
The breakdown of prize money for this year is shown below:
 Winner: 3,500,000 baht
 Runner-up: 1,300,000 baht
 Semi-finalists: 750,000 baht
 Quarter-finalists: 375,000 baht
 Last 16: 150,000 baht
 Third in Group: 75,000 baht
 Fourth in Group: 50,000 baht
 Total: 10,000,000 baht

Round-robin stage
The top two players from each group qualified for the knock-out stage. All matches were best of 9 frames.

Group A

 Ding Junhui 1–5 Noppon Saengkham
 Lyu Haotian 2–5 Tom Ford
 Noppon Saengkham 5–4 Tom Ford
 Ding Junhui 5–3 Lyu Haotian
 Ding Junhui 5–2 Tom Ford
 Noppon Saengkham 5–1 Lyu Haotian

Group B

 Anthony McGill 5–4 Passakorn Suwannawat
 Muhammad Sajjad 0–5 Ryan Day
 Passakorn Suwannawat 5–2 Ryan Day
 Anthony McGill 5–1 Muhammad Sajjad
 Passakorn Suwannawat 1–5 Muhammad Sajjad
 Anthony McGill 5–4 Ryan Day

Group C

 Kyren Wilson 3–5 Thepchaiya Un-Nooh
 Kristján Helgason 5–1 Ricky Walden
 Thepchaiya Un-Nooh 2–5 Ricky Walden
 Kyren Wilson 5–3 Kristján Helgason
 Kyren Wilson 5–3 Ricky Walden
 Thepchaiya Un-Nooh 5–2 Kristján Helgason

Group D

 Atthasit Mahitthi 1–5 Michael Holt
 Liang Wenbo 3–5 Mark Davis
 Liang Wenbo 5–1 Atthasit Mahitthi
 Mark Davis 2–5 Michael Holt
 Liang Wenbo 5–0 Michael Holt
 Atthasit Mahitthi 5–3 Mark Davis

Group E

 Sunny Akani 1–5 Stephen Maguire
 Stuart Bingham 5–2 Kamal Chawla
 Kamal Chawla 4–5 Stephen Maguire
 Stuart Bingham 1–5 Sunny Akani
 Stuart Bingham 5–1 Stephen Maguire
  Sunny Akani 5–2 Kamal Chawla

Group F

 James Wattana 4–5 Mark King
 Mark Williams 5–1 Soheil Vahedi
 Soheil Vahedi 3–5 Mark King
 Mark Williams 5–3 James Wattana
 Mark Williams 5–3 Mark King
 James Wattana 5–0 Soheil Vahedi

Group G

 Graeme Dott 5–1 David Gilbert
 Martin Gould 5–1 Andy Lee
 Martin Gould 4–5 David Gilbert
 Graeme Dott 5–0 Andy Lee
 Andy Lee 3–5 David Gilbert
 Martin Gould 1–5 Graeme Dott

Group H

 Ben Woollaston 2–5 Michael White
 Marco Fu 5–2 Darren Morgan
 Marco Fu 5–2 Michael White
 Ben Woollaston 5–3 Darren Morgan
 Marco Fu 3–5 Ben Woollaston
 Darren Morgan 5–3 Michael White

Knockout stage

Final

Maximum breaks 
(Note: A maximum break in six-red snooker is 75.)
 Noppon Saengkham
 Stuart Bingham

References

External links
 

2017
2017 in Thai sport
2017 in snooker
September 2017 sports events in Thailand